Purnak (also Romanized as Pūrnāk and Poornak; also known as Parnak) is a village in Zangebar Rural District, in the Central District of Poldasht County, West Azerbaijan Province, Iran. At the 2006 census, its population was 599, in 150 families.

References 

Populated places in Poldasht County